Hylaeora caustopis is a moth of the  family Notodontidae. It is known from the southern half of mainland Australia.

The wingspan is about 90 mm for males and 100 mm for females. Adults have dark brown forewings, each with a white stripe extending from the base. The hindwings are pale brown with dark edges. The body is orange.

References

Notodontidae